Round Lake may refer to:

Buildings
Round Lake (gymnastics)

Communities

United States
 Round Lake, Florida, an unincorporated community
 Round Lake, Illinois, a village
 Round Lake, Michigan, a historic settlement
 Round Lake, Minnesota, a city
 Round Lake, New York, a village
 Round Lake, Wisconsin, a town

Lakes

Canada
 Round Lake (Ontario), near Pembroke
 Round Lake (Saskatchewan)
 Round Lake (Vancouver Island)

United States
 Round Lake (Dallas County, Arkansas), a lake of Dallas County, Arkansas
 Round Lake (Florida lake), Polk County
 Round Lake (Bonner County, Idaho)
 Round Lake (Michigan), index page with a list of 80+ lakes named or formerly named Round Lake, including:
 Round Lake (Alger and Delta Counties, Michigan), in Delta County in the Upper Peninsula
 Round Lake (Berrien County, Michigan)
 Round Lake (Minnesota), nearly 60 different lakes by this name, including:
 Round Lake (Eden Prairie)
 Round Lake in Teton County, Montana
 Round Lake (Oneida County, New York)
 Round Lake (Saratoga County, New York)
 Round Lake (St. Lawrence County, New York)
 Round Lake National Natural Landmark, near Syracuse, New York
 Round Lake (Clark County, South Dakota)
 Round Lake (Deuel County, South Dakota)
 Round Lake (Lake County, South Dakota)
 Round Lake (Washington), in Camas, Washington
 Round Lake, Snohomish County, Washington